Sepah Mahalleh (also Romanized as Sepāh Maḩalleh; also known as Sepāh-e Dānesh) is a village in Pazevar Rural District, Rudbast District, Babolsar County, Mazandaran Province, Iran. At the 2006 census, its population was 276, in 83 families.

References 

Populated places in Babolsar County